Norfolk Island Airport , also referred to as Norfolk Island International Airport, is the only airport on Norfolk Island, an external territory of Australia. The island is located in the Pacific Ocean between Australia, New Zealand, and New Caledonia. The airport is operated by the Administration of Norfolk Island, and is on the west side of the island.

History 
In August 1942, the United States Army Air Forces requested that the Australian government construct an aerodrome on Norfolk Island for use by its heavy bombers. It was built by the Civil Constructional Corps, comprising volunteers from New South Wales government departments. The corps was assisted by island residents, with about 300 men employed in total. The first runway was completed in late 1942, with a Royal New Zealand Air Force (RNZAF) plane landing on Christmas Day. The second runway was opened in February 1943, and the workers left the following month.

As Norfolk Island did not have enough flat ground, in 1942 several bulldozers were used to knock the tops off several hills, and fill in the valleys between them. Steel mesh was then used to make a solid surface.

The airfield was never used as an operational base, but "was available to the Allies for use as a staging depot, a refuge for aircraft in distress, and a possible base for anti-submarine patrols". An RNZAF Radar Unit operated on the island as a navigational aid, and it became a stopover for aircraft travelling between Australia, New Caledonia, New Zealand and the Solomon Islands. The RNZAF left the airfield in July 1946. At the airfield was an air-sea rescue unit, a servicing section and a radar unit installation at Mount Bates.

Light aircraft transit 
Norfolk Island is an important transit and refueling point for light aircraft flying between Australia, New Zealand, and the Pacific Islands.

These distances are within the range of many light aircraft when fitted with long range tanks, while the direct distance without using Norfolk Island as a stepping stone, is usually beyond their capabilities.

From New Caledonia other Pacific Islands such as Vanuatu and Fiji are within range and can be used as further 'stepping stones' to the other South Pacific and North Pacific destinations.

Facilities 
The airport is staffed by a single air traffic controller.

The airport has a small passenger terminal building which includes waiting areas as well as processing areas for check in (4 counters), security, emigration control, customs control (Norfolk Customs), baggage reclaim and immigration control (Norfolk Immigration Office). A small cafe (Airport Cafe) is open prior to departing flights.

A small cargo terminal building is located next to passenger terminal.

Airport power is provided by the onsite Norfolk Airport Diesel Power Station.

A small carpark is located at the front entrance of the terminal.

The airport can handle small general aviation aircraft up to a jetliner such as the narrow-body Airbus A320.

Rescue and fire services
Aviation Rescue and Fire Fighting Service of the Norfolk Island Fire Service provides firefighting service for the airport.

The airport fire and rescue has two airport fire tenders. Two new Rosenbauer Panther ARFF replaced two 1960s era Thornycroft Nubian Mk 1 6x6 airport tenders in 2009. A new fire station is being built to replace the current building to house the new fire engines.

Airlines and destinations

Passenger

Notes 
Air New Zealand's services to Norfolk Island normally consist of two flights per week from Brisbane and three flights per week from Sydney using Airbus A320 aircraft. However, due to Air New Zealand staffing issues related to COVID-19 border closures in 2021, Qantas temporarily took over both routes from the Australian mainland to Norfolk Island from 19 March 2021. This was initially to be until 30 August 2021. But Qantas' contract to service Norfolk Island was later extended until 30 June 2022 after Air New Zealand was unable to establish a planned crew base in Brisbane that would have enabled the airline to continue serving the island despite New Zealand and Australia's borders being closed to each other.

Air New Zealand previously also flew from Auckland to Norfolk Island. On 16 December 2016, Air New Zealand announced it was ceasing its flight services between Norfolk Island and Auckland citing low passenger numbers. The last flight was on 21 May 2017.

Norfolk Island Airlines previously operated services for a short time with Nauru Airlines Boeing 737-300s.

Norfolk Jet Express operated from the airport from 1997 to 2005 and Norfolk Air from 2006 to 2012.  In 1996, Ansett Australia was operating nonstop Boeing 737-300 jet service between the airport and Sydney four days a week.

Transportation

The airport is connected to the rest of the island by Douglas Drive.

Transportation to and from the airport can be made by taxi, private car hires or local hotel shuttles.

Statistics 
Norfolk Island Airport was ranked 56th in Australia for the number of revenue passengers served in financial year 2010–2011.

See also
 List of airports in territories of Australia
 Aviation transport in Australia

References

External links 
 

Airports in territories of Australia
Aviation in Norfolk Island
Buildings and structures in Norfolk Island
1942 establishments in Australia
Airports established in 1942
International airports in Australia